Omboué is a town located in Ogooué-Maritime province, Gabon.

Geography 

It is the departmental capital of Etimboué Department. It is situated on the shores of the Fernan Vaz lagoon. It is 589 km away from the national capital, Libreville, by road, but about 200 km in a direct line.

Languages 

The most commonly spoken languages in Omboué are Nkomi (a dialect of Myene) and French (the official language of Gabon).

Facilities 

Within the town is a hospital, a government primary and secondary school, a hotel, a commercial port, a church and a marina pontoon.

Notable people
Jean Ping - politician
 Joseph Rendjambé
 Charles Tchen

External links 
 Hotel Olako - accommodation in Omboue

Populated places in Ogooué-Maritime Province